Thomas Valley "Tosh" McKinlay (born 3 December 1964) is a Scottish former footballer. A fullback or wingback, he spent most of his career in Scotland playing for Dundee, Heart of Midlothian, Celtic and Kilmarnock. He also played for English club Stoke City and Swiss side Grasshoppers. He won 22 international caps for Scotland.

McKinlay currently works for Celtic as a scout.

Club career
McKinlay was an outstanding schoolboy footballer in Glasgow, winning trophies with St Peter's Boys Primary in Partick and St Thomas Aquinas, Jordanhill; he played left wing and was a regular goalscorer with a strong shot on his left foot, only moving to fullback when he turned professional – perhaps surprisingly, he did not score many goals thereafter. He represented Scotland at schoolboy level.

McKinlay began his professional career with Dundee, whom he joined from Celtic Boys Club in 1981. He became a first-team regular while still a teenager and spent over seven years at Dens Park, where he played in three major cup semi-finals and scored a memorable goal in the Dundee derby, before being sold to Heart of Midlothian for £300,000 in December 1988. He stayed with the Tynecastle club for almost seven years, including a runners-up finish behind Rangers in 1991–92.

In November 1994 he joined Celtic in a £350,000 transfer, and just over six months later gained his sole winner's medal as the Glasgow side led by manager Tommy Burns defeated Airdrie to win the 1994–95 Scottish Cup. He provided an assist for the only goal of the final, crossing for Pierre Van Hooijdonk to head in, although in the league they were unable to overtake Rangers during the period. McKinlay was a regular player for the Hoops until he was displaced by Stéphane Mahé in the 1997–98 season, during which time he was involved in a training ground brawl with Henrik Larsson and went on loan to Stoke City; he played three times for the Potters in 1997–98.

After leaving Celtic permanently in 1999, McKinlay spent a year in Switzerland with Grasshopper Club Zürich before returning to Scotland to finish his career with a short spell at Kilmarnock. On retiring he took up a post as an internet sports journalist with a Norwegian media company. He now works as an agent for Celtic Media.

International career
McKinlay won his first full Scotland cap aged 30 in 1995 against Greece and went on to earn selection for both the 1996 European Championships and the 1998 World Cup, where he played as a substitute in the opening game against world champions Brazil and retired after the loss to Morocco which resulted in elimination from the tournament.

Career statistics

Club
Source:

International
Source:

References

External links

Scotland stats at fitbastats.com

1964 births
Living people
Scottish footballers
Footballers from Glasgow
People from Partick
People educated at St Thomas Aquinas Secondary School, Glasgow
Association football fullbacks
Celtic F.C. players
Dundee F.C. players
Grasshopper Club Zürich players
Heart of Midlothian F.C. players
Kilmarnock F.C. players
Scottish Football League players
Scottish Premier League players
Stoke City F.C. players
English Football League players
Swiss Super League players
Scotland under-21 international footballers
Scotland B international footballers
Scotland international footballers
UEFA Euro 1996 players
1998 FIFA World Cup players
Scottish expatriate footballers
Expatriate footballers in Switzerland
Scottish expatriate sportspeople in Switzerland